Green Hills Software is a privately owned company that builds operating systems and programming tools for embedded systems. The firm was founded in 1982 by Dan O'Dowd and Carl Rosenberg. Its world headquarters are in Santa Barbara, California.

History
Green Hills Software and Wind River Systems enacted a 99-year contract as cooperative peers in the embedded software engineering market throughout the 1990s, with their relationship ending in a series of lawsuits throughout the early 2000s. This resulted in their opposite parting of ways, whereupon Wind River devoted itself to publicly embrace Linux and open-source software but Green Hills initiated a public relations campaign decrying its use in issues of national security.

In 2008, the Green Hills real-time operating system (RTOS) named Integrity-178  was the first system to be certified by the National Information Assurance Partnership (NIAP), composed of National Security Agency (NSA) and National Institute of Standards and Technology (NIST), to Evaluation Assurance Level (EAL) 6+.

By November 2008, it was announced that a commercialized version of Integrity 178-B will be available to be sold to the private sector by Integrity Global Security, a subsidiary of Green Hills Software.

On March 27, 2012, a contract was announced between Green Hills Software and Nintendo. This designates MULTI as the official integrated development environment and toolchain for Nintendo and its licensed developers to program the Wii U video game console.

On February 25, 2014, it was announced that the operating system Integrity had been chosen by Urban Aeronautics for their AirMule flying car unmanned aerial vehicle (UAV), since renamed the Tactical Robotics Cormorant.

Selected products

Real-time operating systems 
Integrity is a POSIX real-time operating system (RTOS). An Integrity variant, named Integrity-178B, was certified to Common Criteria Evaluation Assurance Level (EAL) 6+, High Robustness in November 2008.
Micro Velosity (stylized as µ-velOSity) is a real-time microkernel for resource-constrained devices.

Compilers 
Green Hills produces compilers for the programming languages C, C++, Fortran, and Ada. They are cross-platform, for 32- and 64-bit microprocessors, including RISC-V, ARM, Blackfin, ColdFire, MIPS, PowerPC, SuperH, StarCore, x86, V850, and XScale.

Integrated development environments 
MULTI is an integrated development environment (IDE) for the programming languages C, C++, Embedded C++ (EC++), and Ada, aimed at embedded engineers.

TimeMachine  is a set of tools for optimizing and debugging C and C++ software. TimeMachine (introduced 2003) supports reverse debugging, a feature that later also became available in the free GNU Debugger (GDB) 7.0 (2009).

References

Software companies based in California
Software companies established in 1982
1982 establishments in California
Companies based in Santa Barbara County, California
Microkernels
Software companies of the United States